Bellator 263: Pitbull vs. McKee was a mixed martial arts event produced by Bellator MMA that took place on July 31, 2021, at The Forum in Inglewood, California. The event marked Bellator's first outside of the Mohegan Sun bubble and the first Bellator show on the road.

Background 
The event was headlined by the final of the Bellator Featherweight World Grand Prix between the current champion Patrício Pitbull and undefeated A. J. McKee, where winner will also win $1 million prize. Pitbull is the current Bellator Lightweight and Featherweight Champion, who is currently on a seven-fight winning streak and hasn't lost since August 2016. He defeated Emmanuel Sanchez via a first-round guillotine choke in their rematch at Bellator 255. McKee is undefeated as a pro at 17-0 and is also coming off of first-round submission of his own in his last fight, defeating Darrion Caldwell with a neck crank at Bellator 253.

A featherweight bout between Mads Burnell and Emmanuel Sanchez was scheduled as the co-main event.

A lightweight bout between Manny Muro and the undefeated Usman Nurmagomedov was scheduled for the event main card.

A lightweight bout between Islam Mamedov and former Bellator lightweight champion Brent Primus was scheduled as the main card opener.

Two ranked bantamweights, the #3 ranked Magomed Magomedov and #4 ranked Raufeon Stots, were scheduled to compete at the event. On July 19, it was announced that the bout was scratched from the event and was rescheduled for Bellator 264.

A women's flyweight bout between Alejandra Lara and DeAnna Bennett was scheduled to take place at this event. The bout was rescheduled for unknown reasons to take place on August 20, 2021, at Bellator 265.

A lightweight bout between Georgi Karakhanyan and Kiefer Crosbie was scheduled for the event prelims.

Two additional bouts were announced for the event prelims on July 6, 2021: a lightweight bout between Chris Gonzalez and Goiti Yamauchi, as well as a welterweight bout between Johnny Cisneros and Joshua Jones.

A bantamweight bout between Brian Moore and Jared Scoggins was scheduled for this event. However, on July 25, it was announced Scoggins had tested positive for COVID-19 and was replaced by promotional newcomer Jordan Winski.

A 190-pound contract weight fight between Justin Barry and Daniel Compton was to take place at the event, however Barry did not receive medical clearance from the California State Athletic Commission (CSAC) at weigh-ins, leading to the bout being cancelled. Compton was paid his show money.

Results

Reported payout 
The following is the reported payout to the fighters as reported to the California State Athletic Commission. It is important to note the amounts do not include sponsor money, discretionary bonuses, viewership points or additional earnings. The total disclosed payout for the event was $2,094,000.

MAIN CARD (10 p.m. E.T., Showtime)
 A.J. McKee ($150,000/$1,000,000) def. Patricio Freire: ($250,000/$1,000,000)
 Mads Burnell ($26,000/$26,000) def. Emmanuel Sanchez ($61,000/$61,000)
 Usman Nurmagomedov ($30,000/$30,000) def. Manny Muro ($26,000/$0)
 Islam Mamedov ($10,000/$10,000) def. Brent Primus ($50,000/$0)
 Goiti Yamauchi ($32,000/$32,000) def. Chris Gonzalez ($31,000/$31,000)

PRELIMS (7 p.m. E.T., YouTube/PlutoTV)
 Vanessa Porto ($15,000/$15,000) def. Ilara Joanne ($13,000/$13,000)
 Gadzhi Rabadanov ($25,000/$25,000) def. Daniel Carey ($10,000/$10,000)
 Khasan Magomedsharipov ($25,000/$0) def. Jonathan Quiroz ($10,000/$10,000)
 Joshua Jones ($4,000/$4,000) def. Johnny Cisneros ($4,000/$4,000)
 Georgi Karakhanyan ($70,000/$0) def. Kiefer Crosbie ($50,000/$0)
 Brian Moore ($25,000/$25,000) def. Jordan Winski ($10,000/$10,000)

See also 

 2021 in Bellator MMA
 List of Bellator MMA events
 List of current Bellator fighters
 Bellator MMA Rankings

References 

Bellator MMA events
Events in Inglewood, California
2021 in mixed martial arts
July 2021 sports events in the United States
2021 in sports in California
Mixed martial arts in California
Sports competitions in California